Iolaus scintillans, the scintillating sapphire, is a butterfly in the family Lycaenidae. It is found in Senegal, Burkina Faso, northern Ivory Coast, northern Ghana, northern Nigeria, Cameroon, southern Sudan and northern Uganda. The habitat consists of very dry savanna.

The larvae feed on Globimetula braunii.

References

External links

Die Gross-Schmetterlinge der Erde 13: Die Afrikanischen Tagfalter. Plate XIII 68 b and e

Butterflies described in 1905
Iolaus (butterfly)